The Basketball competitions in the 2001 Summer Universiade were held in Beijing, China.

Medalists

External links
https://web.archive.org/web/20100116184925/http://sports123.com/bsk/wun.html
https://web.archive.org/web/20100116184920/http://sports123.com/bsk/mun.html

Basketball
2001
Summer Universiade
Universiade